The United States Embassy in Juba, South Sudan, was first established on 9 July 2011  as the United States diplomatic mission to the country of South Sudan. Upon the independence of South Sudan, the old United States Consulate General Juba, originally opened in 2005 was upgraded into a full embassy, in recognition of the independence of South Sudan. The chief of mission was Chargé d'Affaires R. Barrie Walkley, pending the appointment of an ambassador to South Sudan.

On 18 October 2011 Susan D. Page was confirmed as the first United States' Ambassador to South Sudan.

See also

List of ambassadors of the United States to South Sudan

References

External links
US Embassy Juba

2011 establishments in South Sudan
United States
South Sudan
South Sudan–United States relations
Buildings and structures in Juba